Rich Pumple (born February 11, 1948) is a Canadian retired professional ice hockey forward.  He played 128 games in the World Hockey Association with the Indianapolis Racers and Cleveland Crusaders. Pumple was born in Lachine, Quebec.

External links
 

1948 births
Canadian ice hockey forwards
Cleveland Crusaders players
Indianapolis Racers players
Living people
People from Lachine, Quebec
Roanoke Valley Rebels (SHL) players
Ice hockey people from Montreal